Artace cribrarius, the dot-lined white, is a moth in the family Lasiocampidae. The species was first described by Sven Ingemar Ljungh in 1825.

The MONA or Hodges number for Artace cribrarius is 7683.

References

Further reading

 

Lasiocampidae
Moths described in 1825